À tout prendre (released as All Things Considered in English Canada and as Take It All in the United States) is a Canadian drama film, directed by Claude Jutra and released in 1963. His first film made outside the National Film Board, the film was a semi-autobiographical portrait of Jutra's own life, focusing on his romantic relationship with actress and model Johanne Harrelle, and his struggle to accept his own homosexuality.

Both Jutra and Harrelle played themselves in the film. Notably, the film version of Jutra commits suicide at the end of the film in virtually the same manner, drowning himself in the St. Lawrence River, in which Jutra himself would eventually commit suicide in 1986 after being diagnosed with early-onset Alzheimer's. The film's cast also includes Victor Désy, Tania Fédor, Guy Hoffmann, Monique Joly, Monique Mercure, Patrick Straram and François Tassé, as well as brief cameo appearances by Anne Claire Poirier and François Truffaut.

Considered a landmark film in the history of Quebec and Canadian cinema, the film won the Canadian Film Award for Best Feature Film at the 16th Canadian Film Awards.

Cast
 Claude Jutra as Claude
 Johanne Harrelle as Johanne
  as Monique
 Monique Mercure as Barbara
  as Victor
 Tania Fédor as the mother
  as Nicholas
  as actor
  as The priest
 Anne Claire Poirier as a woman with a surprise party

References

External links

1963 films
1960s French-language films
Canadian drama films
1963 drama films
Films directed by Claude Jutra
Best Picture Genie and Canadian Screen Award winners
1963 LGBT-related films
LGBT-related drama films
Canadian LGBT-related films
Films about interracial romance
Films scored by Maurice Blackburn
Canadian docufiction films
French-language Canadian films
1960s Canadian films